Saint Thomas of Guiana was a Roman Catholic diocese and suffragan of Caracas.

History 
It was erected by Pope Pius VI on 19 December 1791, and comprised the former state of Bermúdez, districts of Nueva Esparta and Guayana, and territories of Amazonas, Colon, Colón, Orinoco and Yuruary, in the south and east of Venezuela.

The Caribs were Christianized by the early Spanish Franciscan missionaries. The episcopal city, Ciudad Bolívar, was established in 1764 by two Jesuits under the governorship of Joaquín de Mendoza, on the right bank of the Orinoco, and called San Tomás de la Nueva Guayana; but owing to a narrowing of the river was commonly known as Angostura. It played an important part in the national history, and in February 1819 Simón Bolivar was elected president there by the Congress of Colombia; in his honor the city has been renamed Ciudad Bolivar.

Bishops 
Colonial era
Mgr. Francisco de Ibarra, born at Guacara, Venezuela
José Antonio Mohedano (1800), born in the Diocese of Toledo
Mgr. José de Silva y Olave (15 March 1815)

After Venezuelan independence
Mgr. Mariano Talavera, of Santa Fé, vicar Apostolic and titular Bishop of Tricala. 
Mgr. Antonio Fortique (12 July 1841)
José Emanuel Arroyo (1856)
Mgr. Antonio Maria Duran (25 Sept. 1891)

External links 
 Thomas of Guiana at the Catholic Encyclopedia
 

StThomas of Guiana
Religious organizations established in 1791
1791 establishments in South America
Roman Catholic dioceses and prelatures established in the 18th century
18th-century establishments in Venezuela
Catholic Church in Venezuela